The 2005–06 Philadelphia 76ers season was the 67th season of the franchise, 57th in the National Basketball Association (NBA). Former Sixers player Maurice Cheeks spent his first season as the coach of the Sixers, and it was the last full season Allen Iverson would spend with the Sixers before getting traded to the Denver Nuggets the following season. He was also selected for the 2006 NBA All-Star Game.

Key dates
 June 28: The 2005 NBA Draft took place in New York City, New York.
 July 1: The free agency period started.
 October 11: The Sixers pre-season started with a game against the Houston Rockets.
 November 1: The Sixers season started with a game against the Milwaukee Bucks.
 April 15: The Sixers are eliminated from the playoff hunt when the Milwaukee Bucks secure the eighth playoff spot after a Sixers' loss to the Orlando Magic.
 April 18: The Sixers beat the New Jersey Nets in the last home game of the season, which was designated as Fan Appreciation Night. This was despite starters Allen Iverson and Chris Webber not arriving until tip-off, an action which would frustrate fans.

Draft picks
Philadelphia's selections from the 2005 NBA Draft in New York, New York.

Roster

Regular season

Season standings

Record vs. opponents

Player statistics

Regular season

Awards and records
 Allen Iverson, All-NBA Third Team

References

See also
 2005-06 NBA season

Philadelphia 76ers seasons
Phil
Philadelphia
Philadelphia